Stan Chervin is a screenwriter.

On January 24, 2012, he was nominated for an Academy Award for Best Adapted Screenplay for the movie Moneyball. His nomination was shared with Steven Zaillian and Aaron Sorkin.

He is Jewish.

Career

Filmography

References

External links
 

Living people
Year of birth missing (living people)
Place of birth missing (living people)